Alpine skiing at the 1960 Winter Olympics at Squaw Valley, California consisted of six events. Competitions took place at Squaw Peak (Men's downhill), KT-22 (Women's downhill, Men's slalom and giant slalom) and  Papoose Peak (Women's slalom and giant slalom).

The 1960 Winter Games was the last that recorded race result times in tenths of a second; at the 1964 Winter Games the race result times were recorded in hundredths.

Medal summary
Seven nations won medals in alpine skiing, with Switzerland leading the medal table, winning two golds. Austria won the most total medals with five, one gold, two silver, and two bronze. Austria's Ernst Hinterseer  led the individual medal table, with one gold and one bronze. The top women's medalist was the United States' Penny Pitou with two silver medals.

Medal table

Source:

Men's events

Source:

Women's events

Source:

Course information

Participating nations
Twenty-two nations sent alpine skiers to compete in the events in Squaw Valley, and South Korea made its Olympic alpine skiing debut. Below is a list of the competing nations; in parentheses are the number of national competitors.

World championships
From 1948 through 1980, the alpine skiing events at the Winter Olympics also served as the World Championships, held every two years.  With the addition of the giant slalom, the combined event was dropped for 1950 and 1952, but returned as a World Championship event in 1954 as a "paper race" which used the results from the three events. During the Olympics from 1956 through 1980, World Championship medals were awarded by the FIS for the combined event. The combined returned as a separate event at the World Championships in 1982 and at the Olympics in 1988.

Combined

Men's Combined

Downhill: February 22, Giant Slalom: February 21, Slalom: February 24

Women's Combined

Downhill: February 20, Giant Slalom: February 23, Slalom: February 26

References

External links
FIS-Ski.com – alpine skiing – 1960 Winter Olympics – Squaw Valley, USA

 
1960 Winter Olympics events
Alpine skiing at the Winter Olympics
Winter Olympics
Alpine skiing competitions in the United States
Skiing in California